Courtney Jenaé Woolsey is an American, Los Angeles-based, singer and songwriter. Her songs are published by Sony/ATV.

Courtney Jenaé co-wrote "Paradise" for Girls Generation's album, Lion Heart, which reached No. 1 on Billboard's World Albums Chart.

She also co-wrote Exo’s 2015 single "Love Me Right" which went platinum in the first week. She has written songs for numerous artists including "Bad Case Of U" for Bella Thorne, which was featured in Alvin and the Chipmunks: The Road Chip, "Shake That Brass" by Amber, "Magnetic" by Elliott Yamin, "Crush" by I.O.I, and "Tuk Tok" by Twice.

Woolsey co-wrote and was featured on two Blasterjaxx singles, "You Found Me" released by Spinnin’ Records and "Forever" released by Dim Mak.

Discography

As featured artist
 2014: Blasterjaxx – "You Found Me" feat. Courtney Jenaé (single) [Spinnin’ Records]
 2015: Blasterjaxx – "Forever" feat. Courtney Jenaé (single) [Dim Mak Records]
 2020: Eurovision Song Contest: The Story of Fire Saga – "Running With The Wolves" feat. Courtney Jenaé (album) [Arista Records]

Writing credits

References

Year of birth missing (living people)
Living people
Singer-songwriters from California
American women singer-songwriters
21st-century American women